XRuby was the first Ruby to Java static compiler which compiles Ruby source code (.rb) to Java bytecode (.class). It is notable because it contains a complete ANTLR grammar for Ruby 1.8 source code.

See also 

 Comparison of programming languages
 Duck typing
 IronRuby
 JRuby
 Rubinius
 Ruby on Rails
 Watir

External links

 XRuby language home page
 Google code for XRuby Project
 XRuby Project Group
 XRuby Enjoy Ruby on JVM
 XRuby: Another Approach to Ruby on the JVM

Free compilers and interpreters
Ruby (programming language)